Ei8ht is the eighth studio album by Nik Kershaw, released on his independent label Shorthouse Records in 2012. The album reached No. 91 on the UK Albums Chart and No. 12 on the UK Independent Albums Chart.

Background
Kershaw started working on the album in early 2011. Speaking to The Evening Times in 2012, he said: "I sat down about 18 months ago and decided it was time to make another [album]. I have to do that every now and again to get it out my system."

Two singles were released from the album. A radio version of "The Sky's The Limit" was released in August, with a music video for the song premiering on YouTube on 4 August. It was directed by Steve Price and was filmed at Armagh Observatory and Armagh Planetarium, Northern Ireland, and Haytor, Dartmoor. The second and final single, "You're the Best", was released in September.

"The Sky's the Limit" was featured in the 2016 biographical film Eddie the Eagle and appeared on its soundtrack release, Fly.

Reception

Upon release, Ben Hogwood of musicOMH wrote: "Good songwriters don't usually lose their knack overnight, and Kershaw proves that as he gets on this particular bike once more. Many of the songs grow in to earworms, which by the third or fourth listen are burned in to the consciousness." Fiona Shepherd of The Scotsman stated: "In less conservative hands, this desperately dull MOR pop album might yield an insipid hit or two, but Kershaw's arrangements drain the life from the songs."

Track listing

Charts

Personnel
 Nik Kershaw - vocals, guitar, keyboards, programming
 Robbie Bronnimann - keyboards
 Jon-Willy Rydningen - piano (tracks 2, 6)
 Ric Sanders - fiddle (track 6)
 Geese - strings
 Paul Geary - bass
 Eirik Rydningen - drums
 Chesney Hawkes, Keely Hawkes, Shaz Sparks - backing vocals (track 12)

Production
 Nik Kershaw - producer, arranger, programming
 Robbie Bronnimann - programming, additional production (track 12), mixing (track 12)
 Eirik Rydningen - mixing (track 8)
 Mark Evans - mixing (track 1)

References

2012 albums
Nik Kershaw albums